Deokota Memorial School (DMS) was a school in Teenpaini, Biratnagar, Nepal.

Staffs
Dilip Kumar Banerjee, Laxmi Kant Nandi, Saraswoti Karki, Sarita, and Sofia are teachers of the school. The headmaster is Deepak Shrestha.

About the school 
Tika Prasad Uprety was the founder of the school. He established the school with the slogan "Tamaso Ma Jyotirgamaya", which means illuminating the darkness or ignorance with the aroma of knowledge. The school emphasized ethics, moral principles, and discipline. A hundred-marks subject called "Discipline" was used to assess the tidiness, regularity, study habits, and behavior of the students on an everyday basis. Music was compulsory, and included violin, drum, guitar, harmonium, and vocal practices. The school also focused on extracurricular activities with debate, painting, spelling and quiz contest teams, singing and dancing, and football, cricket and volleyball tournaments held on regular basis. The school was established with the motto "A school with a difference".

Achievements
The school has produced many doctors, nurses, engineers, pilots, nurses, and musicians and is renowned for its quality education and discipline. Every year hundreds of students pass the S.L.C examination securing good marks with many distinctions. The school has won numerous prizes including SQC (Student Quality Circle) award, an international event organized in Lucknow.

Closure
The school closed and was sold in 2016.

Educational institutions with year of establishment missing
Educational institutions disestablished in 2016
Morang District
Schools in Nepal
Biratnagar
2016 disestablishments in Nepal